Govinda "Govin" Julian Saputra is an Indonesian basketball player. He plays both forward positions.

Personal life
Govinda Julian Saputra graduated from Perbanas Institute in South Jakarta.

Playing career
Govinda has been with Pelita Jaya since 2017.

National team
Govinda Julian Saputra made his debut in the Indonesian basketball national team at the 2021 FIBA Asia Cup qualification under head coach Rajko Toroman.

His invitation came thanks to his strong performances in the 2020 IBL Indonesia.

His debut game was against Thailand at the Khalifa Sports City Stadium, in Manama, Bahrain, at the end of November 2020. In 10 minutes playing time, he contributed 5 points to his home country's 90-76 victory.

Career Statistics

IBL

Regular season

Playoffs

References

External links
FIBA profile 
Profile at Eurobasket.com
scoutBasketball profile

1996 births
Living people
Forwards (basketball)
Indonesian men's basketball players
Sportspeople from Jakarta